State Route 92 (SR 92) is part of Maine's systems of numbered state highways, located in Washington County. It runs from U.S. Route 1 (US 1) in Machias to an unnumbered road intersection in Machiasport.

Route description
SR 92 begins at an intersection with US 1 (Dublin Street) just south of its crossing of the Machias River and north of the University of Maine at Machias campus. The road heads west for about  around a small memorial park before turning north onto O'Brien Avenue. It heads past a few houses before marking a sharp turn to the east onto Elm Street. After passing a few more houses and a small factory, SR 92 heads into a more wooded area with only a few houses lining the road. After entering Machaisport, the road starts to bend towards the southeast. Rim Road soon intersects the state route which provides access to Machaisport Station, across the Machais River. The road name becomes Port Road and more houses begin to line the road. Turning to the south, it now closely follows the shoreline of Machias Bay. The road curves to the west to enter the town center of Machaisport. SR 92 ends at an intersection with Old Country Road though Port Road continues south as an unnumbered state-maintained highway.

Major junctions

References

External links

Floodgap Roadgap's RoadsAroundME: Maine State Route 92

092
Transportation in Washington County, Maine